Omar Dallal (born 19 March 1981) is a Jordanian swimmer. He competed in the men's 400 metre freestyle event at the 1996 Summer Olympics.

References

External links
 

1981 births
Living people
Jordanian male swimmers
Olympic swimmers of Jordan
Swimmers at the 1996 Summer Olympics
Place of birth missing (living people)